The following is an overview of Public housing estates in Tai Wai, Hong Kong, including Home Ownership Scheme (HOS), Private Sector Participation Scheme (PSPS), and Tenants Purchase Scheme (TPS) estates. Management is by the Hong Kong Housing Authority.

History

The history of public housing estates in Tai Wai is linked to the history of Sha Tin New Town, which started in the 1970s, and to the opening of Tai Wai station in 1983. Unlike Sha Tin Town Centre, public housing estates in Tai Wai are mostly built on old sites of villages and fields, instead of reclaimed land.

Overview

Chun Shek Estate

Chun Shek Estate is located near Che Kung Temple and Che Kung Temple station. It consists of 4 residential blocks completed in 1984.

Carado Garden

Carado Garden is a Private Sector Participation Scheme court in Tai Wai, near Tin Sam Village, Lung Hang Estate and Hin Yiu Estate. It consists of 6 blocks built in 1990.

Fung Shing Court

Fung Shing Court is a Home Ownership Scheme court in Tai Wai, near Sun Tin Wai Estate. It consists of three blocks built in 1985.

Grandway Garden

Grandway Garden is a Private Sector Participation Scheme court in Tai Wai, near MTR Tai Wai station and Holford Garden. It was jointly developed by the Hong Kong Housing Authority and Chevalier Group. It consists of 3 blocks built in 1989.

Hin Keng Estate / Hin Yiu Estate

Hin Keng Estate is a mixed public and TPS estate at the south of Tai Wai. Named for nearby Hin Tin Village and Keng Hau Village, the estate consists of 8 residential buildings completed between 1986 and 1989. Some of the flats were sold to tenants through Tenants Purchase Scheme Phase 3 in 2000. There is another adjacent public estate, Hin Yiu Estate, which has only one residential building.

Since Hin Keng Estate is far away from MTR Tai Wai station, the main transportation is buses and minibuses currently in there. In the future, Hin Keng station of Sha Tin to Central Link is proposed to be built near Hin Keng Estate to provide railway service for Hin Keng residents. The station opened for public service on 14 February 2020.

Hin Keng Estate houses

Hin Yiu Estate houses

Holford Garden

Holford Garden is a Private Sector Participation Scheme court in Tai Wai, near MTR Tai Wai station. It is the first PSPS court in Sha Tin District. It consists of 3 blocks built in 1985, constructed by China State Construction Engineering Corporation.

Ka Shun Court

Ka Shun Court is a Home Ownership Scheme court in Tai Wai, near Hin Keng Estate and Union Hospital. It is located in Hin Tin, within walking distance of the Hin Keng station which was opened on 14 February 2020. It is a single block with totally 248 flats completed in 2018.

Ka Keng Court
Ka Keng Court is a Home Ownership Scheme court in Tai Wai, near Hin Keng Estate. It consists of two Concord blocks built in 2002.

Ka Tin Court

Ka Tin Court is a Home Ownership Scheme court in Tai Wai, near Hin Keng Estate. It consists of six Flexi blocks built in 1988.

King Tin Court

King Tin Court is a Home Ownership Scheme court in Tai Wai, near Lung Hang Estate. It consists of 6 blocks built in 1983.

Lung Hang Estate

Lung Hang Estate is located between Hin Keng Estate and Sun Chui Estate, and consists of 6 residential blocks completed in 1983 and 1985 respectively.

Mei Lam Estate / May Shing Court / Mei Chung Court

Mei Lam Estate is a public estate consisting of 4 residential buildings with 4,100 rental flats, a shopping centre and a sports centre, located along Shing Mun River Channel and near Mei Chung Court, May Shing Court and Shing Mun Tunnel. It was constructed in three phases. Phase 1 (Mei Fung House, Mei Yeung House, Mei Tao House and Mei Lam Shopping Centre) are located at the south side of Shing Mun River Channel, while Phase 2 (Mei Wai House) and Phase 3 (Mei Lam Sports Centre) are located at the north side. The two sides are connected by a footbridge. The authorized population was 11,400 as at end December 2007.

Mei Pak Court

Mei Pak Court is a Home Ownership Scheme court in Heung Fun Liu, Tai Wai of Sha Tin District, near May Shing Court. It is one 33-storey block court with 288 flats in total. It was sold in 2014 and completed in 2017.

Mei Tin Estate

Mei Tin Estate is located at the south of Shing Mun River Channel and near Mei Lam Estate. Formerly the site of a village called Heung Fan Liu, the estate consists of 7 residential blocks in Phase 1, 2 and 3 completed in 2006 and 2008. Phase 4 was completed by 2013.

Mei Ying Court

Mei Ying Court is a Home Ownership Scheme court in Heung Fun Liu, Tai Wai of Sha Tin District, near Mei Tin Estate. It is a single-block court with 216 flats in total. It was sold in 2014 and completed in 2017.

Sun Chui Estate

Sun Chui Estate is located near Lung Hang Estate, Che Kung Miu Temple and Tai Wai station. It consists of 8 residential buildings completed in 1983, 1984 and 1985 respectively.

Sun Tin Wai Estate

Sun Tin Wai Estate was built on the hill at the south of Chun Shek Estate along Lion Rock Tunnel Road. It consists of 8 residential blocks completed in 1981 and 1982.

See also
 Public housing in Hong Kong
 List of public housing estates in Hong Kong

References

Tai Wai